Four in One is the umbrella title for a wheel series broadcast in the United States on the NBC television network as part of its 1970-71 schedule in the Wednesday 10 PM Eastern time slot.

Four in One consisted of six episodes of each of four dramatic series: McCloud, San Francisco International Airport, Night Gallery and The Psychiatrist.  All six episodes of each program were run in order; then all were rerun interspersed with each other with a different series being shown each week.

After the season, McCloud had proven sufficiently popular to be included as an element in a new wheel-format series, NBC Mystery Movie, while Night Gallery was picked up as a stand-alone series.  The other two elements, San Francisco International Airport and The Psychiatrist, were cancelled.

Episodes

References

Brooks, Tim and Marsh, Earle, The Complete Directory to Prime Time Network and Cable TV Shows

NBC original programming
1970 American television series debuts
1971 American television series endings
Television series by Universal Television